Hector Martin Cantero (born September 9, 1990), also known as marcan, is a security hacker known for hacking multiple PlayStation generations, the Wii and other devices.  Martin is lead developer on the Asahi Linux project.

Biography

Education 
Martin went to the American School of Bilbao (Spain), where he received his primary and secondary education.

Career
Since 2011, he has been an official staff volunteer at Euskal Encounter, Gipuzkoa Encounter and Araba Encounter LAN parties. He is the coordinator of the Free Software area, where he organizes the "Hack It / Solve It" competition (a cybersecurity challenge known as capture the flag) and the "AI Contest" competition.

He has been part of Team Twiizers, where he was responsible for reverse engineering and hacking the Wii. He was the first to write an open source driver for the Microsoft Kinect by reverse engineering for which he was widely credited. Sony sued him and others for hacking the PlayStation 3; the case was eventually settled out of court. In 2016, he ported Linux to the PlayStation 4 and demonstrated that at the 33rd Chaos Communication Congress by running Steam inside Linux. He wrote the usbmuxd tool for synchronizing data from iPhones to Linux computers.

In 2021, Martin founded the Asahi Linux project, an effort to port Linux to the new Apple silicon-powered Macs. He currently remains the lead developer on the project. While reverse engineering Apple's hardware, Martin discovered the "M1racles" security vulnerability on the Apple M1 processor.

See also

References

External links 
 
 Hector Martin's YouTube ― Asahi Linux coding streams

1990 births
Living people
Hackers
Computer security specialists